Anthocleista vogelii (Family Gentianaceae) commonly called "Murderer's Mat" (from the Ashanti language, the significance unclear) or "Cabbage Tree" in several countries in Africa is a rainforest tree ultimately reaching to  in height with leaves in opposite pairs up to  long and five inches (12 centimeters) in width in adult trees. These are the largest leaves of any African Dicot.

References

Hook. Ic. Pl. I. 793. (1848).

Flora of Africa
vogelii
Plants described in 1848
Taxa named by Jules Émile Planchon